This is a list of members of the Western Australian Legislative Council from 22 May 1930 to 21 May 1932. The chamber had 30 seats made up of ten provinces each electing three members, on a system of rotation whereby one-third of the members would retire at each biennial election.

Notes
 On 9 August 1931, South-East Province Country MLC Hector Stewart died. Country candidate Alec Thomson won the resulting by-election on 26 September 1931.
 On 10 December 1931, Metropolitan Province Nationalist MLC Arthur Lovekin died. Nationalist candidate Leonard Bolton won the resulting by-election on 6 February 1932.

Sources
 
 
 

Members of Western Australian parliaments by term